WRQX (600 kHz) – branded as AM 600 The Patriot – is a commercial talk radio station licensed to Salem, Ohio, and serving the Youngstown metropolitan area. Owned by Cumulus Media, WRQX is the local market affiliate for CBS News Radio and multiple talk programs from co-owned syndicator Westwood One. The WRQX studios are located in "The Radio Center" in Youngstown, while the transmitter is located in nearby Winona.  In addition to a standard analog transmission, WRQX is available online.

History
The station began operations on June 25, 1965 as WSOM, which stood for "The Wonderful Sound Of Music". For decades, the station featured an adult standards format, including longtime Youngstown radio personalities Dick Thompson, Johnny Kay and Gary Rhamy. In its early years, WSOM was a daytimer, required to go off the air at night.  It eventually got authorization to broadcast around the clock using low power at night.

WSOM changed to a talk radio format on December 13, 2010, mostly carrying an all-syndicated lineup in contrast to co-owned WPIC, one notable exception being a local afternoon show, Afternoons with Tracey and Friends. The station reverted to adult standards in September 2016, this time carrying programming from co-owned Westwood One's "America's Best Music".

WSOM changed formats again, this time to classic country, on December 26, 2016.

WRQX call letters
With Educational Media Foundation's purchase of WRQX in Washington, D.C., the WRQX callsign–retained by Cumulus in the deal–was transferred to WSOM in a callsign "parking" move on May 31, 2019, becoming WRQX. Concurrently, the WSOM letters moved to the former WRQX until new calls were selected for that facility. With the switch to K-Love programming later that day, the Washington station took the WLVW call sign.  In addition, the new WRQX removed all instances of "WSOM" from its website and re-branded as "AM 600 WRQX," with updated imaging, logos and website domain.

On May 24, 2021, WRQX flipped to conservative talk radio, branded as "The Patriot".

Programming
WRQX carries all nationally syndicated talk shows, mostly from Cumulus-owned Westwood One.  Mornings begin with "America in the Morning" and "First Light" news magazines.  They are followed by Chris Plante, Dan Bongino, Ben Shapiro, Michael Knowles, Rich Eisen, Jim Bohannon and "Red Eye Radio."  World and national news is supplied by CBS News Radio.

Previous logo

References

External links

RQX (AM)
News and talk radio stations in the United States
Cumulus Media radio stations
Radio stations established in 1965
1965 establishments in Ohio
Conservative talk radio